Yacolt Burn State Forest is a 90,000 acre state forest located in southern Washington in the foothills of the Cascade Range. It is named after the Yacolt Burn, a collection of wildfires that broke out in 1902. The Washington State Department of Natural Resources manages the land for timber harvesting and recreation.

Long-term ecological research is conducted within a portion of the forest called Abby Road.

Recreation
Yacolt Burn State Forest has a trail system that can accommodate horseback riding, off-road vehicles, mountain biking, and hiking. Target shooting is also allowed. There are several maintained campgrounds located within the forest.

References

Washington (state) state forests